The following is a list of international specialty television programmes which have debuted, or are scheduled to debut on Australian television in 2010.

Miniseries

Telemovies

Specials

Documentaries

References

Australian television-related lists